Special non-state-to-state relations is a term used by Ma Ying-jeou, the former President of the Republic of China (often called "Taiwan"), to describe the nature of relations between the Taiwan Area and the Mainland China Area. President Ma has used the term at least once, although to describe the term as a concept or policy would be premature, especially as it describes those relations loosely in terms of what they are not (rather than what those relations are).

Departing from the former presidents Lee Teng-hui's special state-to-state relations and Chen Shui-bian's One Country on Each Side in which both define the Republic of China (ROC) and the People's Republic of China (PRC) as states and the relationship between the two as one between two states, Ma Ying-jeou defines the relations as a special relationship between two areas within one state. The ROC government considers that state as the ROC, while the PRC government considers that state as the PRC. While the governing authority in one area cannot recognise the authority in the other area as a legitimate government, neither would deny the other side being the de facto governing authority of one area of the state. According to this view the relations between the two areas are special and laws relating to international relations cannot be applied.

Background
President Ma Ying-jeou on 2 September 2008 stated in an interview with the Mexico-based press, Sol de Mexico, that the relations between mainland China and Taiwan are "special," but "not that between two states", because neither the Constitution of the People's Republic of China nor the Constitution of the ROC allows for another state to exist in their respective claimed territory. He conceded the sovereignty issues between the two cannot be resolved at present, but citing the 1992 Consensus as a temporary measure for the issues, as both accept the One China principle but agrees to differ on the definition of that one "China".

Presidential Office spokesman Wang Yu-chi later elaborated the president's statement and said that under the 11th amendment of the ROC Constitution and the "Statute Governing the Relations Between the Peoples of the Taiwan Area and Mainland Area", the relationship between Taiwan and mainland China is one between two regions of one country. From the ROC's perspective, that country is the ROC.

Ma Ying-jeou was interviewed by the Japanese magazine World on 7 October 2008. In answering questions relating to the "Special non-state-to-state relations", he said that the ROC "definitely is an independent sovereign state", and under its constitution, mainland China is part of the territory of the ROC. The ROC cannot recognise the existence of another state in its territory, nor does the People's Republic of China want to recognize the ROC. In other words, the ROC does not consider the PRC a state. Accordingly, laws relating to international relations cannot be applied regarding the relations between Taiwan and mainland China.

In an interview with the Central News Agency on 25 October 2008, Ma Ying-jeou clarified that conceptualising Taiwan and mainland China as "two areas" was not his invention, but believed the framework offered a way for the two sides of the Taiwan Strait to sidestep sovereignty questions in pursuing closer ties as long as each side did not deny the other's existence. Ma said consultations between the two sides' intermediary bodies have been conducted under such a "mutual non-denial" framework. According to Ma, the "two areas" concept could be dated back to 1991, when then-President Lee Teng-hui announced the termination of the Period of National Mobilisation for Suppression of the Communist Rebellion to acknowledge the fact that the two sides of the Taiwan Strait are under separate rule. The move symbolised that the communist regime established on 1 October 1949 in mainland China is no longer considered by the ROC as a "rebellious group," but "a governing authority that has de facto rule of the mainland," Ma said. Over the past 17 years, several other concepts have been put forth by the country's leaders to try to define Cross-Strait relations, but none has been proven feasible, he said. These include the special state-to-state relations proposed by Lee in 1999, and the one country on each side theory raised by then President Chen Shui-bian in 2002, Ma noted.

See also
Political status of Taiwan
Two Chinas
Special state-to-state relations
One Country on Each Side

References

External links 

Cross-Strait relations